The Oxnard Press-Courier was a newspaper located in Oxnard, California, United States.  It ceased publication in June 1994 after 95 years.  In 1992, its daily circulation was 17,325.

History

The paper traced its origins to the Oxnard Courier which was a weekly paper established in 1899.  A daily edition, obviously named the Daily Oxnard-Courier, started publication in June 1909.  The Oxnard Press-Courier was the name adopted in 1940, reflecting a consolidation of the Oxnard Evening Press, Oxnard Daily Courier, and Oxnard News.

George and Eva Grimes, and David Calvert and his wife, purchased the paper in March 1945, when it had a circulation of 1,200.

In 1963, the Brush-Moore Newspapers group bought the paper.  In 1967, Brush-Moore sold the paper to Thomson Newspapers as part of a sale of 12 papers, for $72 million, in what was the largest ever newspaper transaction at that time.  Thomson owned the paper until it shut down in June 1994, citing a poor economy and a competitive newspaper market in Ventura County.  That competition included the Los Angeles Times, who in 1990 began publishing a daily Ventura County edition, replacing a weekly Ventura County section of the paper.

Today, news from the Oxnard City Council and the boards of education are now published in the Ventura County Star.

1940s Associated Press dispute
A U. S. District Court in Los Angeles awarded the Associated Press a $3,780 judgement against Press-Courier publisher, Dan W. Emmett, on June 20, 1942, for attempting to withdraw from the A.P. without giving two year's notice as required by the association's bylaws. Judge Leon R. Yankwich stated that when Emmett refused to accept service and, without notice, failed to pay his weekly assessment, he became liable for 104 weeks assessments in a lump sum based on the rate Emmett paid in May 1940 when he entered the contract.

References

External links
 Oxnard Courier archives 1900-1919 on Google news
 Daily Oxnard Courier archives 1909-1912 on Google news
 Oxnard Daily-Courier archives 1911-1940 on Google news
 Oxnard Press-Courier archives 1940-1959, 1993-1994 on Google news

Defunct newspapers published in California
Mass media in Ventura County, California
History of Oxnard, California
Daily newspapers published in Greater Los Angeles
1967 establishments in California
1994 disestablishments in California